Marcus Edwin Gwyn (born November 4, 1977) is an American former professional baseball relief pitcher.

Career
After being drafted by the Oakland Athletics in the 2000 Major League Baseball draft, Gwyn made his major league debut on July 29, for the Los Angeles Angels of Anaheim. On January 4, he signed a minor league deal with the Florida Marlins, but was released on July 25, 2008, after spending the entire year with Triple-A Albuquerque. On July 29, he signed a contract with the Tohoku Rakuten Golden Eagles of Nippon Professional Baseball.

References

External links

1977 births
Living people
Albuquerque Isotopes players
American expatriate baseball players in Canada
American expatriate baseball players in Japan
Arizona League Athletics players
Baseball players from Oklahoma
Arkansas Travelers players
Los Angeles Angels players
Major League Baseball pitchers
Midland RockHounds players
Modesto A's players
Rice Owls baseball players
Sacramento River Cats players
Salt Lake Bees players
Sportspeople from Tulsa, Oklahoma
Tohoku Rakuten Golden Eagles players
Vancouver Canadians players